Sara Netanyahu (née Ben-Artzi; born 5 November 1958) is the wife of Israeli Prime Minister Benjamin Netanyahu. By profession, she is an educational and career psychologist. She is the Spouse of the Prime Minister of Israel holding the role for her third time.

Early life

Sara Ben-Artzi (later Netanyahu) was born in the northern Israeli town of Kiryat Tiv'on, near Haifa. Her father, Shmuel Ben-Artzi, was a Polish-born Israeli Jewish educator, author, poet and biblical scholar, who died in 2011 at the age of 96. Her mother, Chava (née Paritzky; 1922–2003), was a sixth-generation Jerusalemite. She has three brothers, all of whom were Israel Bible Contest champions: Matanya Ben-Artzi, a professor of mathematics, Hagai Ben-Artzi, a professor of Bible and Jewish Thought, and Amatzia Ben-Artzi, a technology entrepreneur. She attended Greenberg High School in Kiryat Tiv'on, where she was an outstanding student.

Career
She later worked as a reporter for Maariv LaNoar, a weekly magazine for Israeli teenagers. In the Israel Defense Forces, she was a psycho-technical evaluator in the Department of Behavioral Sciences of the Military Intelligence Directorate ("Aman"). Netanyahu completed a BA in psychology at Tel Aviv University in 1984 and her master's degree at the Hebrew University of Jerusalem in 1996.

Netanyahu worked as a psychotechnical evaluator of gifted children at the Institute for Promoting Youth Creativity and Excellence headed by Dr. Erika Landau, and at a rehabilitation center of the Ministry of Labour. She also worked as an El Al flight attendant.

As Consort of the Premier,  Netanyahu chaired Yad b'Yad, an aid organization for abused children and Tza'ad Kadima for children with cerebral palsy. In 2001, she went to work as an educational psychologist in the psychological service of the Jerusalem Municipality.

Her work includes psychological diagnoses and treatment for children in the school system and assistance to children from families in distress.

Personal life
Netanyahu married Doron Neuberger in 1980. The couple divorced in 1987.

In 1991, she married Benjamin Netanyahu. They have two sons, Yair and Avner. In 2010, Avner won the International Bible Contest on the national level, and came in third place on the international level.

Controversy

Netanyahu has received much media attention, usually negative in tone and focusing on poor interpersonal relations. She won a libel case filed against Schocken publishers for falsely maligning her, and a libel suit in 2002 against the local paper Kol Ha'ir, after two unfounded reports were published about her in the paper's gossip column. In 2008, Channel 10 reported that when she travelled to London with her husband for a public diplomacy campaign during the 2006 Lebanon War, she spent a large sum of money on luxuries paid for by a donor in London. In response Netanyahu filed a libel suit against the channel. As her trip had not been approved by the Knesset's Ethics Committee, her husband was notified by the committee.

In January 2010, the Netanyahu family housekeeper sued Sara Netanyahu in a labor court for withholding wages, unfair working conditions and verbal abuse.  Netanyahu was sued   by another caretaker and former bodyguard to the family over claims that she was abusive towards him. In February 2016, the Jerusalem Labor Court ruled in favor of plaintiff Meni Naftali, who claimed that Sara Netanyahu had created a hostile work environment and awarded him damages of NIS 170,000. The National Labor Court subsequently rejected her appeal.

In 2015, reports surfaced that she had ordered catered meals and charged the government nearly $100,000 for the expenses when the Prime Minister's Office already employed a cook. Police recommended indicting her in 2016. On September 8, 2017, Attorney General Avichai Mandelblit announced that Netanyahu would be charged with ordering meals at the state’s expense without authorization. On 17 January 2018, the pre-indictment hearing was held. Netanyahu's lawyers met with Mandelblit, while she herself did not attend, breaking with usual custom. After negotiations for a plea bargain collapsed, the trial was set for July 19. Netanyahu's lawyers argued that the meals were ordered by an assistant for visiting dignitaries.

On 16 June 2019, Netanyahu signed a plea deal and was convicted of misusing state funds, with the more severe charge of fraud being dropped. She was ordered to pay 55,000 NIS ($15,275) to the state.

During a visit to a Portuguese memorial to the victims of the Inquisition, Netanyahu stated that her family is also facing an inquisition.

See also
 Women in Israel
 Spouse of the Prime Minister of Israel

References

External links
 

1958 births
Living people
Educational psychologists
Hebrew University of Jerusalem alumni
Israeli Jews
Israeli people of Polish-Jewish descent
Israeli people of Russian-Jewish descent
Israeli psychologists
Sara
People from Kiryat Tiv'on
Spouses of prime ministers of Israel
Tel Aviv University alumni
Israeli women psychologists